Orbis Pictus, or Orbis Sensualium Pictus (Visible World in Pictures), is a textbook for children written by Czech educator John Amos Comenius and published in 1658. It was the first widely used children's textbook with pictures, published first in Latin and German and later republished in many European languages. The revolutionary book quickly spread around Europe and became the defining children's textbook for centuries.

Contents
The book is divided into chapters illustrated by copperplate prints, which are described in the accompanying text. In most editions, the text is given in both Latin and the child's native language.  The book has 150 chapters and covers a wide range of subjects:

inanimate nature
botanics
zoology
religion
humans and their activities

History

Originally published in Latin and German in 1658 in Nuremberg, the book soon spread to schools in Germany and other countries. The first English edition was published in 1659. The first quadrilingual edition (in Latin, German, Italian and French) was published in 1666. The first Czech translation was published in the 1685 quadrilingual edition (together with Latin, German and Hungarian), by the Breuer publishing house in Levoča. In the years 1670 to 1780, new editions were published in various languages, with upgraded both pictures and text content.

Orbis Pictus had a long-lasting influence on children's education. It was a precursor of both audio-visual techniques and the lexical approach in language learning.

In 1930 Otto Neurath claimed that images in Gesellschaft und Wirtschaft constituted a new Orbis Pictus.

See also

Comenius
 Great Didactic

References

External links

Online selections from Orbis Pictus in Latin
  
 At Internet Archive, the first American from the twelfth London edition, 1810. https://archive.org/details/orbissensualiump00come/page/n5/mode/2up
  - translation by Charles Hoole, at Google Book Search
Orbis sensualium pictus trilinguis. Latin, German and Hungarian, 1708
 Orbis sensualium pictus trilinguis. Leutschoviae : Typis Samuelis Brewer, Anno Salutis 1685. 484 s.  - - available at ULB's Digital Library
 Orbis Pictus, in hungaricum et germanicum translatus. Po'sonban: Weber, 19. stor. 172 s. - available at ULB's Digital Library
 Orbis pictus von Amos Comenius. [Nürnberg]: [s.n.], 1770. 263 s. - available at ULB's Digital Library

Books by John Amos Comenius
Children's encyclopedias
1658 books
Illustrated books
Latin encyclopedias
Czech encyclopedias
German encyclopedias
Hungarian encyclopedias
Italian-language encyclopedias
French encyclopedias
Multilingual texts
17th-century encyclopedias
John Amos Comenius
17th-century Latin books